The 2006 Vuelta a Andalucía was held on 12 February to 16 February 2006, the 52nd running of this road bicycle race. It started in Antequera and finished in Seville, and was won by Carlos García Quesada.

Teams
Fourteen teams of up to seven riders started the race:

 
 
 
 
 
 
 
 
 
 
 Kaiku
 
 
 3 Molinos Resort

General classification

References

Vuelta a Andalucia
Vuelta a Andalucía by year
2006 in Spanish sport